Nancun is a township-level division of Chang'an District, Shijiazhuang, Hebei, China. In 1977, a piece of ceramic created 5400-5500 years ago and designed to look like a silkworm was discovered in the area, providing the earliest known evidence of sericulture.

See also
List of township-level divisions of Hebei

References

Township-level divisions of Hebei